The Spider Murphy Gang is a German band from Munich best known for their greatest hit "Skandal im Sperrbezirk", which is a famous song of the Neue Deutsche Welle. It was founded in 1977 by bank clerk Günther Sigl, together with Gerhard Gmell ("Barny Murphy"), Michael Busse and Franz Trojan. Elements of the Bavarian German dialect are used in many songs.

Their name is a reference to Elvis Presley's song, "Jailhouse Rock", in which a 'Spider Murphy' played the tenor saxophone. "Spider Murphy" is also referred to in a song written by Larry Kirwan of the Irish fusion Band Black 47's song, "Forty Deuce."  The song appears referential to both the Spider Murphy Gang and to "Jailhouse Rock", for the live version from 2006's "Bittersweet 16" includes a saxophone solo which the singer recalls having heard in Sing Sing prison.

Band members
Günther Sigl – Vocals/Bass
Gerhard Gmell – Guitar
Willie Duncan – Guitar/Bass/Lap Steel/Mandolin/Vocals
Otto Staniloi – Sax
Paul Dax – Drums
Lucky Seuss – Keys

Discography

Albums
Rock'n'Roll (1978)
Rock'n'Roll Schuah (1980)
Dolce Vita (1981)
Tutti Frutti (1982)
Spider Murphy Gang live! (1983)
Scharf wia Peperoni (1984)
Wahre Liebe (1985)
Überdosis Rock'n'Roll (1987)
In Flagranti (1989)
Hokuspokus (1990)
Keine Lust auf schlechte Zeiten (1997)
Rock'n'Roll Story (1997)
Das komplette Konzert (1999)
Radio Hitz (2002)
Skandal im Lustspielhaus (2004)

External links

 Official homepage
 Wort-Laut
 Management

1977 establishments in Germany
Neue Deutsche Welle groups
German rock music groups
Musical groups established in 1977
Musical groups from Munich